Lutterbach is a commune in the Haut-Rhin department in Alsace in north-eastern France. It forms part of the Mulhouse Alsace Agglomération, the inter-communal local government body for the Mulhouse conurbation.

Line 3 of the Mulhouse tramway links the station to central Mulhouse, and a tram-train service runs over the same tram route before continuing to Thann on the railway.

Population

See also
 Communes of the Haut-Rhin département

References

Communes of Haut-Rhin